Gurgaon Rural is a census town in Gurgaon district in the Indian state of Haryana.

Demographics
As of 2011 India census, Gurgaon Rural had a population of 17,100+. Males constitute 54% of the population and females 46%. Gurgaon Rural has an average literacy rate of 80.03%, higher than the national average of 74.04%. The place is Under development by Haryana government.

References

Cities and towns in Gurgaon district